Aechmea pittieri is a plant species in the genus Aechmea. This species is native to Costa Rica and Panama.

References

pittieri
Flora of Central America
Plants described in 1896